Once Upon a Time in Hollywood is a 2019  comedy-drama film written and directed by Quentin Tarantino. Produced by Columbia Pictures, Bona Film Group, Heyday Films, and Visiona Romantica and distributed by Sony Pictures Releasing, it is a co-production between the United States and the United Kingdom. It features a large ensemble cast led by Leonardo DiCaprio, Brad Pitt, Margot Robbie, Emile Hirsch, Margaret Qualley, Timothy Olyphant, Austin Butler, Dakota Fanning, Bruce Dern, and Al Pacino. Set in 1969 Los Angeles, the film follows an actor and his stunt double, as they navigate the changing film industry, and features "multiple storylines in a modern fairy tale tribute to the final moments of Hollywood's golden age".

The film premiered at the Cannes Film Festival on May 21, 2019, and was theatrically released in the United States on July 26, 2019 and in the United Kingdom on August 14. It grossed $374 million worldwide, and received praise from critics for Tarantino's screenplay and direction, acting, cinematography, costume design, production values, and soundtrack. It was chosen by the National Board of Review, American Film Institute and Time magazine as one of the ten best films of the year. At the 77th Golden Globe Awards, it was nominated for five awards, winning three of them including one for Best Motion Picture – Musical or Comedy. It received ten nominations at the 92nd Academy Awards, including Best Picture, Best Director, Best Actor and Best Supporting Actor.

Awards and nominations

Notes

See also
 2019 in film
 Once Upon a Time in Hollywood (novel)

References

External links 
 

Lists of accolades by film
Quentin Tarantino